Delta is an American versatile family of expendable launch systems that has provided space launch capability in the United States since 1960. Japan also launched license-built derivatives (N-I, N-II, and H-I) from 1975 to 1992. More than 300 Delta rockets have been launched with a 95% success rate. Only the Delta IV Heavy rocket remains in use as of November 2020. Delta rockets  have stopped being manufactured in favor of Vulcan.

Origins 

The original Delta rockets used a modified version of the PGM-17 Thor, the first ballistic missile deployed by the United States Air Force (USAF), as their first stage. The Thor had been designed in the mid-1950s to reach Moscow from bases in Britain or similar allied nations, and the first wholly successful Thor launch had occurred in September 1957. Subsequent satellite and space probe flights soon followed, using a Thor first stage with several different upper stages. The fourth upper stage used on the Thor was the Thor "Delta", delta being the fourth letter of the Greek alphabet. Eventually the entire Thor-Delta launch vehicle came to be called simply "Delta.”

NASA intended Delta as "an interim general purpose vehicle" to be "used for communication, meteorological, and scientific satellites and lunar probes during 1960 and 1961". The plan was to replace Delta with other rocket designs when they came on-line. From this point onward, the launch vehicle family was split into civilian variants flown from Cape Canaveral which bore the Delta name and military variants flown from Vandenberg Air Force Base (VAFB) which used the more warlike Thor name. The Delta design emphasized reliability rather than performance by replacing components which had caused problems on earlier Thor flights; in particular the trouble-prone inertial guidance package made by AC Spark Plug was replaced by a radio ground guidance system, which was mounted to the second stage instead of the first. NASA made the original Delta contract to the Douglas Aircraft Company in April 1959 for 12 vehicles of this design:

 Stage 1: Modified Thor IRBM with a Block I MB-3 engine group consisting of one Rocketdyne LR-79 Main Engine and two Rocketdyne LR-101 vernier thrusters for roll control, producing a total of  thrust including LOX/RP1 turbopump exhaust.
 Stage 2: Modified Able. Pressure fed UDMH/nitric acid powered Aerojet AJ-10-118 engine producing . This reliable engine cost US$4 million to build and is still flying in modified form today. Gas jet attitude control system.
 Stage 3: Altair. A spin-stabilized (via a turntable on top of the Able) at 100 rpm by two solid rocket motors before separation. One ABL X-248 solid rocket motor provided  of thrust for 28 seconds.

These vehicles would be able to place  into a  LEO or  into GTO. Eleven of the twelve initial Delta flights were successful and until 1968, no failures occurred in the first two minutes of launch. The high degree of success achieved by Delta stood in contrast to the endless parade of failures that dogged West Coast Thor launches. The total project development and launch cost came to US$43 million, US$3 million over budget. An order for 14 more vehicles was made before 1962.

Thor-Delta flights

Evolution

Delta A

Delta B

Delta C

Delta D

Delta E

Delta F

Delta G

Delta J

Delta K

Delta L

Delta M

Delta N

"Super Six"

Launch reliability 
From 1969 through 1978 (inclusive), Thor-Delta was NASA's most used launcher, with 84 launch attempts. (Scout was the second-most used vehicle with 32 launches.) Satellites for other government agencies and foreign governments were also launched on a cost-reimbursable basis, totaling sixty-three satellites. Out of the 84 launch attempts there were seven failures or partial failures, a 91.6% success rate.

The Delta was a launch success, but it has also been a significant contributor to orbital debris, as a variant used in the 1970's was prone to in-orbit explosions. Eight Delta second stages launched between 1973 and 1981 were involved in fragmentation events between 1973 and 1991 usually within the first 3 years after launch, but others have broken apart 10 or more years later.  Studies determined they were caused by propellant left after shut down. The nature of the propellant and the thermal environment the derelict rockets were in made explosions inevitable. Depletion burns were started in 1981 and no fragmentation events for rockets launched after that have been identified. Delta's launched before the 1970's variant have had fragmentation events as long as 50 years after launch.

Numbering system 
In 1972, McDonnell Douglas introduced a four-digit numbering system to replace the letter-naming system. The new system could better accommodate the various changes and improvements to Delta rockets and avoided the problem of a rapidly depleting alphabet. The digits specified (1) the tank and main engine type, (2) number of solid rocket boosters, (3) second stage (letters in the following table refer to the engine), and (4) third stage:

This numbering system was to have been phased out in favor of a new system that was introduced in 2005. In practice, the new system was never used, as all but the Delta II have been retired:

Delta 0100-series

Delta 1000-series

Delta 2000-series

Delta 3000-series

Delta 4000-series

Delta 5000-series

Delta II (6000-series and 7000-series) 
The Delta II series was developed after the 1986 Challenger accident and consisted of the Delta 6000-series and 7000-series, with two variants (Lite and Heavy) of the latter.

The Delta 6000-series introduced the Extra Extended Long Tank first stage, which was 12 feet longer, and the Castor 4A boosters. Six SRBs ignited at takeoff and three ignited in the air.

The Delta 7000-series introduced the RS-27A main engine, which was modified for efficiency at high altitude at some cost to low-altitude performance, and the lighter and more powerful GEM-40 solid boosters from Hercules. The Delta II Med-Lite was a 7000-series with no third stage and fewer strap-ons (often three, sometimes four) that was usually used for small NASA missions. The Delta II Heavy was a Delta II 792X with the enlarged GEM-46 boosters from Delta III.

Delta III (8000-Series) 
The Delta III 8000-series was a McDonnell Douglas / Boeing-developed program to keep pace with growing satellite masses:
 The two upper stages, with low-performance fuels, were replaced with a single cryogenic stage, improving performance and reducing recurring costs and pad labor. The engine was a single Pratt & Whitney RL10, from the Centaur upper stage. The hydrogen fuel tank, 4 metre in diameter in orange insulation, is exposed; the narrower oxygen tank and engine are covered until stage ignition. Fuel tank contracted to Mitsubishi, and produced using technologies from Japanese H-II launcher.
 To keep the stack short and resistant to crosswinds, the first-stage kerosene tank was widened and shortened, matching the upper-stage and fairing diameters.
 Nine enlarged GEM-46 solid boosters were attached. Three have thrust-vectoring nozzles.

Of the three Delta III flights, the first two were failures and the third carried only a dummy (inert) payload.

Delta IV (9000-series) 
As part of the Air Force's Evolved Expendable Launch Vehicle (EELV) program, McDonnell Douglas / Boeing proposed Delta IV. As the program implies, many components and technologies were borrowed from existing launchers. Both Boeing and Lockheed Martin were contracted to produce their EELV designs. Delta IVs are produced in a new facility in Decatur, Alabama.

 The first stage changed to liquid hydrogen fuel. Tank technologies derived from Delta III upper stage, but widened to 5 metre.
 The kerosene engine replaced with Rocketdyne RS-68, the first new, large liquid-fueled rocket engine designed in the United States since the Space Shuttle Main Engine (SSME) in the '70s. Designed for low cost; has lower chamber pressure and efficiency than the SSME, and a much simpler nozzle. Thrust chamber and upper nozzle is a channel-wall design, pioneered by Soviet engines. Lower nozzle is ablatively cooled.
 The second stage and fairing taken from the Delta III in smaller (Delta IV Medium) models; widened to 5 metre in Medium+ and Heavy models.
 Medium+ models have two or four GEM 60, 60-inch diameter solid boosters.
 The plumbing was revised and electrical circuits eliminate need for a launch tower.

The first stage is referred to as a Common Booster Core (CBC); a Delta IV Heavy attaches two extra CBCs as boosters.

Delta IV Heavy

See also 

 Comparison of orbital launchers families
 Comparison of orbital launch systems
 List of Thor and Delta launches
 HoloVID visualization tool
 Space debris
 Project Echo

References 

 Forsyth, Kevin S. (2002) Delta: The Ultimate Thor, In Roger Launius and Dennis Jenkins (Eds.), To Reach The High Frontier: A History of U.S. Launch Vehicles, Lexington: University Press of Kentucky,

External links 

 History of the Delta Launch Vehicle
 Delta Launch Record
 The Satellite Encyclopedia - Thor Delta

 
Military space program of the United States
Rocket families
United Launch Alliance space launch vehicles
Spacecraft that broke apart in space